Guru Gobind Singh Marg is the historical route taken by tenth guru of Sikhs Guru Gobind Singh from Anandpur Sahib to Talwandi Sabo in year 1705.  Sikh people contemplate this marg as pious and holy as their guru passed through it. This memorable and eventful journey of 47 days by Sikh Guru and his troops has got significant place in the history of Punjab. This highway, measuring about 577 kilometres  connects all the 91 sacred shrines with which Guru's name is eternally associated. On this marg 20 Dashmesh pillars, with the inscription of the holy and sacred verses of the great Guru have been installed.

History 
Guru Gobind Singh Marg was inaugurated on April 10, 1973, amidst great rejoicing and fanfare with efforts of then Chief Minister of Punjab, Giani Zail Singh. The original map of this marg has been prepared by Trilok Singh Chitarkar and published by  Languages Department, Punjab in year 1972.  It is now proposed to extend this road up to Nanded, Maharashtra.

Prominent landmarks 

Prominent Gurdwaras connected by this highway are Anandpur Sahib, Parivar Vichora, Bhatha Sahib, Chamkaur Sahib, Machhiwara, Alamgir Sahib, Raikot, Dina Kangar, Kotkapura, Muktsar and Talwandi Sabo.

See also 
 Battle of Chamkaur
 Battle of Muktsar
 Saka Sirhind

References

External links 

Sikh places
Memorials to Guru Gobind Singh
Roads in Punjab, India